Daniel Patrick Kerwin (July 9, 1874 – July 13, 1960) was an outfielder in Major League Baseball. He played for the Cincinnati Reds in 1903.

References

External links

1874 births
1960 deaths
Major League Baseball outfielders
Cincinnati Reds players
Baseball players from Philadelphia
Macon Hornets players
New York Metropolitans (minor league) players
Newark Colts players
Hanover Tigers players
Buffalo Bisons (minor league) players
Scranton Miners players
Louisville Colonels (minor league) players
Kansas City Blues (baseball) players
Milwaukee Brewers (minor league) players
Montgomery Climbers players
Hannibal Cannibals players
Mobile Sea Gulls players
Quincy Infants players
Quincy Old Soldiers players
Quincy Gems players